The Minister for European Affairs, Culture and Sport was one of the ministerial portfolios which comprised the Sipilä Cabinet. The responsibilities of the Minister for European Affairs, the Minister of Culture, and the Minister of Sport were combined in the portfolio.

The holder of the portfolio for the Sipilä Cabinet was Sampo Terho of the Blue Reform.

References 

Lists of government ministers of Finland